L107 was a Scottish independent local radio station, serving Lanarkshire. The station broadcast on 107.5 and 107.9 FM from studios and offices in Hamilton.

History
L107 replaced '107 The Edge', which was originally launched as "Clan FM" from 1999 until 2003, when it was saved from closure by the Kingdom Radio Group and rebranded. Within two years, the station was again saved from closure by former BBC Radio 1 and Radio Clyde presenter Mark Page (founder of the UK forces station Garrison Radio), who led its relaunch as L107, a full service local station.

The station closed at 10am on 18 August 2008 but was again saved and reopened at 9am on 26 August 2008 following a buyout and continued broadcasting for a further two years.

The station went off air for almost a week on 30 April 2010 when its main transmitter was removed from its Hamilton site.

After a period of a week of dead air followed by several days of automated music and commercials, L107's licence was handed back to the broadcasting regulator Ofcom on Thursday 12 November 2010. Earlier that month, the regulator had recorded a breach of format against the station regarding its local news output.

References

Radio stations in Scotland
Defunct radio stations in the United Kingdom